Stingray Pipeline is a natural gas pipeline which brings natural gas from the offshore Gulf of Mexico to Louisiana.  It is owned by Energy Transfer.  Its FERC code is 69.

References

External links
Pipeline Electronic Bulletin Board

Natural gas pipelines in the United States
Enbridge pipelines
Natural gas pipelines in Louisiana